Henry Lynch may refer to:
Henry Lynch (baseball) (1866–1925), baseball player
Sir Henry Lynch, 1st Baronet (died 1635), knight and land agent
Sir Henry Lynch, 3rd Baronet (died 1691), Irish landowner, barrister and judge
Henry Blosse Lynch (1807–1873), Anglo-English explorer
Henry T. Lynch (1928-2019), American physician
H. F. B. Lynch (Henry Finnis Blosse Lynch, 1862–1913), British traveller, businessman and Member of Parliament

See also
Henry Lynch-Staunton (1873–1941), British sport shooter, who competed in the 1908 Summer Olympics